Lyubov Yudina (born 13 January 1981) is a Russian swimmer. She competed at the 2000 Summer Olympics in the 4×100 m and 4×200 m freestyle relays and finished in tenth place in both events.

References

External links
Lubov YUDINA. les-sports.info

1981 births
Living people
Olympic swimmers of Russia
Russian female freestyle swimmers
Swimmers at the 2000 Summer Olympics
Sportspeople from Volgograd